The Arrondissement of Blaye is an arrondissement of France in the Gironde department in the Nouvelle-Aquitaine region. It has 62 communes.

Composition

The communes of the arrondissement of Blaye are:

Anglade
Bayon-sur-Gironde
Berson
Blaye
Bourg
Braud-et-Saint-Louis
Campugnan
Cars
Cartelègue
Cavignac
Cézac
Civrac-de-Blaye
Comps
Cubnezais
Cubzac-les-Ponts
Donnezac
Étauliers
Eyrans
Fours
Gauriac
Gauriaguet
Générac
Lansac
Laruscade
Marcenais
Marsas
Mazion
Mombrier
Peujard
Plassac
Pleine-Selve
Prignac-et-Marcamps
Pugnac
Reignac
Saint-André-de-Cubzac
Saint-Androny
Saint-Aubin-de-Blaye
Saint-Christoly-de-Blaye
Saint-Ciers-de-Canesse
Saint-Ciers-sur-Gironde
Saint-Genès-de-Blaye
Saint-Gervais
Saint-Girons-d'Aiguevives
Saint-Laurent-d'Arce
Saint-Mariens
Saint-Martin-Lacaussade
Saint-Palais
Saint-Paul
Saint-Savin
Saint-Seurin-de-Bourg
Saint-Seurin-de-Cursac
Saint-Trojan
Saint-Vivien-de-Blaye
Saint-Yzan-de-Soudiac
Samonac
Saugon
Tauriac
Teuillac
Val-de-Livenne
Val-de-Virvée
Villeneuve
Virsac

History

The arrondissement of Blaye was created in 1800. At the May 2006 reorganisation of the arrondissements of Gironde, it gained the canton of Saint-André-de-Cubzac from the arrondissement of Bordeaux.

As a result of the reorganisation of the cantons of France which came into effect in 2015, the borders of the cantons are no longer related to the borders of the arrondissements. The cantons of the arrondissement of Blaye were, as of January 2015:
 Blaye
 Bourg
 Saint-André-de-Cubzac
 Saint-Ciers-sur-Gironde
 Saint-Savin

References

Blaye